Lake Township is one of seventeen townships in Kosciusko County, Indiana, United States. As of the 2010 census, its population was 1,588 and it contained 758 housing units.

Lake Township was organized in 1870.

Geography

Cities and towns
 Silver Lake

References

External links
 Indiana Township Association
 United Township Association of Indiana

Townships in Kosciusko County, Indiana
Townships in Indiana